Cuandixia, also spelled Chuandixia, is a historic village dating from the Ming dynasty located in Zhaitang, Mentougou District in Beijing, China. It is a popular tourist attraction known for its well preserved courtyard homes.

Overview
Cuan (爨) means "cooking-stove" in Chinese. In the year 1958, it was simplified as Chuan (in Chinese: 川). The reason why this hamlet has this name is that the host would like to be away from chill. It is famous because it has a history of 400 years during the Ming Dynasty. At that time, Cuandixia's settlers migrated from Shanxi, a province west of Beijing. It is a stronghold on the way from Beijing to Shanxi.

The family name of all of the villagers living here is Han (韩/韓), which means that they share the same ancestor. Hundreds of years old, the houses here still maintain the style of Ming and Qing Dynasty. Therefore, it is an attractive historical site, where thousands of people come here from its surrounding cities. There are 500 houses left. Stone carving, brick carving, calligraphy, and painting are everywhere. Common figures used are bats, pied magpies, Peonies, waterlilies, etc. Each of them has its typical meaning.

The site is a National Village Architecture Reserve.

Location
Cuandixia is located on ancient post road roughly 90 km northwest from central Beijing in the Jingxi mountain region. The village is served by National Road 109 and can be reached via bus number 929 which departs from Pingguoyuan subway station. Travel from central Beijing takes about three hours by car.

History
Cuandixia was founded during the Ming dynasty (1368–1644) by members of the Han clan who moved from Shanxi Province. Towards the end of the Qing Dynasty, Cuandixia prospered from trading in coal, fur, and grain.

Attractions
Cuandixia is home to 500 well preserved courtyard homes dating to the Ming and Qing dynasties. Many of these homes have been converted into inns offering food and lodging to travelers. Stone paved lanes and steep staircases help define Cuandixia's architectural identity. The village is a frequent subject of photographers and painters. The surrounding area is full of mountains and trails for hikers.

References

External links
 Official entry in Mentougou Governmental website
 "The History Culture Village China Cuandixia"

Villages in China
Tourist attractions in Beijing
Buildings and structures in Beijing
Major National Historical and Cultural Sites in Beijing
Mentougou District